Dmitri Semyonovich Sukhorukov (2 November 1922 – 8 July 2003) was a Red Army General of the army who commanded the Soviet airborne between 1979 and 1987, during the Soviet–Afghan War. Sukhorukov fought as company commander in the 104th Guards Rifle Division during World War II and served in the 7th Guards Airborne Division postwar. In September 1962, he became the commander of the 98th Guards Airborne Division. He commanded the 2nd Army Corps from July 1968. After graduating from the Military Academy of the General Staff, Sukhorukov commanded the Central Group of Forces in November 1976. From January 1979 to July 1987, he was the commander of the Soviet airborne, overseeing its operations in Afghanistan. In July 1987, he became the deputy defence minister for personnel and in 1990 was in the Group of Inspectors General. After retiring in 1992, Sukhorokov died on 8 July 2003.

Early life 
Sukhorukov was born on 2 November 1922 to a peasant family in Bely Kolodez village in Korochansky Uyezd, Kursk Governorate. In 1939 he entered the Leningrad Military Engineering School, from which he graduated in 1941.

World War II 
Sukhorukov was a platoon commander from 1941 to 1943. During 1943 and 1944, he was a company commander of military school cadets. In April 1944, Sukhorukov became a company commander in the 332nd Guards Rifle Regiment of the 104th Guards Rifle Division.

Postwar 
Sukhorukov initially was a battalion commander in the airborne and then the deputy commander of the 80th Airborne Regiment. In 1958, Sukhorukov graduated from the Frunze Military Academy, after which he commanded the 108th Guards Airborne Regiment. In 1961, Sukhorukov became the 7th Guards Airborne Division's chief of staff and commanded the 98th Guards Airborne Division from 1962 to 1966. In 1966, Sukhorukov became a corps deputy commander and a corps commander in 1969. He was the deputy commander of the Soviet airborne from 1969. In 1971, he became an army commander. Sukhorukov was the Transcaucasian Military District's deputy commander from 1974 to 1976, after which he led the Central Group of Forces. He replaced Vasily Margelov as commanded of the Soviet airborne in 1979. In 1987, Sukhorukov was replaced by Nikolai Kalinin and became the deputy defense minister for personnel. In 1992, he retired. He published his memoirs in 2000. Sukhroukov died on 8 July 2003 in Moscow.

References 

1922 births
2003 deaths
People from Shebekinsky District
People from Korochansky Uyezd
Army generals (Soviet Union)
Commanders of the Soviet Airborne Forces
Frunze Military Academy alumni
Military Academy of the General Staff of the Armed Forces of the Soviet Union alumni
Soviet military personnel of World War II
Recipients of the Order of Lenin
Recipients of the Order of the Red Banner
Recipients of the Order of Kutuzov, 1st class
Recipients of the Order of Honour (Russia)
Recipients of the Order of the White Lion
Burials in Troyekurovskoye Cemetery